Oiketicus kirbyi is a moth of the family Psychidae. It is found in lowlands from Argentina to Mexico and on the Caribbean islands.

There is strong sexual dimorphism in the adults. Females are wingless.

The larvae feed on various plants, including Musa, Theobroma cacao, Elaeis guineensis, Bactris gasipaes, Cocos nucifera, Citrus, Tectona grandis, Eucalyptus, Persea americana, Eriobotrya japonica and Terminalia catappa. It was a serious pest in commercial banana plantations on Costa Rica's Atlantic coast from 1962 to 1964. It developed into a serious pest in oil palm plantations in the 1990s.

External links
Treknature.com: Oiketicus kirbyi
Asd-cr.com: Oiketicus kirbyi species info
Oiketicus kirbyi (Lepidoptera, Psychidae), a key pest in Peruvian orchards of avocado

Psychidae
Moths of North America
Moths of Central America
Moths of South America
Lepidoptera of the Caribbean
Lepidoptera of Brazil
Arthropods of Argentina
Moths described in 1827